Yadollah Khalili (born 1330 in Tehran) is the  2nd brigadier general  pilot Grumman F-14 Tomcat of the Air Force of the Islamic Republic of Iran.

A few days before the Iran-Iraq war, he collided with seven Iraqi MiG-21 fighters without missiles and only with a 20-mm Tomcat machine gun, and drove those planes out of Iranian airspace. He also holds the record for the longest uninterrupted flight with a fighter in Haas, Iran. He flew in just one flight for about 12 hours with eight refuelings.

See also 

 List of Iranian flying aces

References 

Islamic Republic of Iran Army personnel of the Iran–Iraq War
People from Tehran